Sandra Agard Hon. FRSL is a British storyteller, writer, literary consultant and cultural historian. She is a published author of short stories and poetry, and for more than 40 years has performed her work, including plays, within the UK as well as internationally. She has worked in libraries as a literature development officer, as well as in art galleries and with community groups in many other settings. In 2022, she was elected an Honorary Fellow of the Royal Society of Literature (RSL) and was the recipient of the RSL's Benson Medal.

Biography 
Sandra A. Agard was born in Hackney, London, to Guyanese parents who had travelled to the UK in the early 1950s.

In a career spanning 40 years, she has been a professional storyteller, author, tutor, playwright, literary consultant, editor and cultural historian, working in educational, cultural institutions, organisations and literary festivals throughout the UK and internationally, including in the United States. Her plays have been performed at such venues as the Royal Court Young People's Theatre, the Polka Theatre, the Lyric Hammersmith and The Drill Hall in London. Publications where her short stories have appeared include Tales, Myths and Legends, Time for Telling and in Malorie Blackman's anthology Unheard Voices.

Her storytelling is characteristically "steeped in African Caribbean oral traditions", and she is best known for her popular interactive stories with children, through which she encourages them to become involved, explaining the inspiration behind the stories. Her recently published work includes the 2019 children's book Harriet Tubman: A Journey to Freedom. 

Agard was Centenary Storyteller in Resident at the Roald Dahl Museum and Story Centre, and her other previous employment includes various engagements with organisations such as Southwark and Lewisham Libraries in south-east London, and the Ministry of Stories. She is currently a Learning Facilitator for Schools at The British Library.

In 2022, Agard was elected as an Honorary Fellow of the Royal Society of Literature (RSL). She was also awarded the RSL's Benson Medal, which honours a whole career of service to literature.

Bibliography 
 Trailblazers: Harriet Tubman, Stripes Publishing, 2019,

References

External links 
 "Storytelling with Sandra Agard - Grimms Remix", The Story Museum.
 "Rumplestiltskin with Sandra Agard", The Story Museum.
 "Concertina book by Sandra Agard and Allen Fatimaharan", The British Library.

Living people
21st-century British women writers
21st-century British dramatists and playwrights
Black British women writers
British storytellers
British women children's writers
Cultural historians
English people of Guyanese descent
People from the London Borough of Hackney
Year of birth missing (living people)